Agustín Giay (born 16 January 2004) is an Argentine professional footballer who plays for San Lorenzo.

Early life 
Born in San Carlos Centro, Agustín Giay first played with local clubs, before joining San Lorenzo as a 13 years old.

Club career 
Agustín Giay made his professional debut for San Lorenzo on the 19 April 2022, starting in the 1–2 away Copa de la Liga win to CA Unión.

His scored his first goal for the club on 9 July 2022, during a Primera División home game against Boca Juniors, helping his team to a 2–1 surprise win, as he scored the equalizer. Along with players like Agustín Martegani, Giay was part of a youthful but promising San Lorenzo squad.

References

External links

2004 births
Living people
Argentine footballers
Argentina youth international footballers
Association football midfielders
Sportspeople from Santa Fe Province
San Lorenzo de Almagro footballers
Argentine Primera División players
Argentine people of Italian descent